Hannah Dudley (1862–1931) was a Methodist mission sister who worked amongst Indo-Fijians in the Suva area of Fiji for 13 years. She had few educational qualifications but was revered for her kind-heartedness and self-sacrifice. Indo-Fijians in Suva called her Hamari Mataji (Our Honoured Mother). She did her work with dedication but was sometimes eccentric and independent minded.

Family Background 
Hannah Dudley was born on 11 July 1862 in Morpeth, New South Wales, Australia [NSW BDM 10189/1862]. She was the daughter of Hannah (née Brereton) and Charles Dudley who immigrated on the Harbinger from the United Kingdom to Australia as single assisted immigrants, arriving on 12 February 1849. Hannah Brereton and Charles Dudley married soon after arriving in Australia, but there is no obvious marriage record in NSW BDM. Hannah and Charles had eight children [NSW BDM], with four living to adulthood.

Mission sister in India 
She served as a teacher in New South Wales before joining the British Methodist Missionary Society as a mission sister in India where she became conversant in Tamil and Urdu. She worked hard, without regard to her health and after six years her health broke down. She returned to Australia for medical treatment and was refused permission to serve in India again on medical grounds.

Arrival in Fiji
In February 1897, at the Conference for Overseas Missions, she heard of the need for a mission sister for Indian work in Fiji. She offered her services and with her knowledge of Urdu was happily accepted. Women's organisations linked to the Methodist Church in Australia raised funds for her trip and she was farewelled from the Ashfield Methodist Church (NSW) on 24 August 1897, arriving in Suva in September 1897. There were no facilities to accommodate her in Suva, and being determined to live close to the Indians, she found a room with a verandah in the Indian quarter of Suva.

Early years in Fiji
She established the first school for Indian children in Suva, on her verandah, where she taught Urdu and English to 40 children. Her time-table was: School from 8 a.m. to 3 p.m., visiting homes from 4 p.m. to 6 p.m. and three nights a week of night school for young men until 9:30 p.m. On Wednesday nights she held  a class for Christian instruction and on Sundays she held services on her verandah. On Sundays she also walked three miles to the local gaol to speak to 400 prisoners and pray with condemned prisoners about to be hanged. Initially, she was paid only £50 p.a. and this was raised to £75 p.a. in 1899. With this meagre sum she supported herself and later five children as well. In 1900, her widowed mother, Mrs Hannah Dudley, and sister, Lilly Dudley, came to live with her and assist her in her work. Lilly taught music in Suva to earn money to support the Dudley family and the mission.

Indian Mission Hall
As the Church realised the extent of her work, erection of two native school buildings at Nausori and Davuilevu were authorised and she was allowed to use the Jubilee Church for her day classes and for her Indian services on Sundays. She wanted a wooden church and collected money to have one built and it dedicated on 19 December 1901 at the site of the present Dudley High School, called the Indian Mission Hall.

Adopted children
During her first year of arrival in Fiji, she began adopting orphans. She started with two girls and a boy but soon the number of adopted children had grown to eleven. The most famous of these was a boy given to Hannah Dudley by his father when the mother deserted him. He took his foster-mother's name and became Raymond Dudley. He went on to become the President of the New Zealand Methodist Conference in 1956. As her adopted family grew, the Church decided to build an orphanage for her at Davuilevu but she refused to move there. In 1904 an orphanage was built at Davuilevu, called The Dudley Orphanage for Indian Children.

On 26 July 1905, she suddenly left for Bengal to join the Faith Mission, taking the children with her under her own name. Weeping Indians on the Suva Wharf showed the general feeling of the Indian community but the Mission Board in Sydney was annoyed with her for relinquishing her work. Indian mission work in Suva suffered in her absence. She returned to Suva in July 1908. Two of the children that she had taken with her had died in India.

Later years
She again devoted herself to her work but her influence had waned. She had seen the effect that the indenture system had had on Indians in Fiji, particularly on women, and did her best to have the system abolished. She left Fiji in August 1913 because of illness, taking five girls and young Raymond with her. Australian immigration laws forced her to move with her children to Auckland. In 1924, she again offered to return to Fiji but her offer was declined because of her age and her independent habits. She died in Auckland on 3 May 1931 at the age of sixty-eight, and was buried at Hillsborough Cemetery. She has left behind her legacy in Suva - the Dudley High School and the Dudley Memorial Church.

See also
 Methodism
 Methodist Church of Fiji and Rotuma

External links
 History of Dudley High School
  Hannah Dudley's Letter in opposition to the indenture system

References

 A.H. Wood, Overseas Missions of the Australian Methodist Church, Volume III: Fiji-Indian and Rotuma, The Aldersgate Press, Victoria, Australia, 1978
 M. Sidal, Hannah Dudley : Hamari Maa : Honoured Mother, Educator, and Missioner to the Indentured Indians of Fiji, 1864-1931, Published by Pacific Theological College, Suva, Fiji, 1997

 Obituary photograph of Miss Hannah Dudley (1862–1931) Papers Past | Newspapers | Auckland Star | 6 May 1931 | Miss Hannah Dudley. (natlib.govt.nz) https://paperspast.natlib.govt.nz/newspapers/AS19310506.2.156.4

 Obituary of Miss Hannah Dudley (1862–1931) Papers Past | Newspapers | Auckland Star | 6 May 1931 | MISS HANNAH DUDLEY. (natlib.govt.nz) https://trove.nla.gov.au/newspaper/article/16776392
 Death notice of Miss Hannah Dudley (1862–1931) 09 May 1931 - MISS HANNAH DUDLEY. - Trove (nla.gov.au) https://trove.nla.gov.au/newspaper/article/16776392
 Obituary of Miss Hannah Dudley (1862–1931) 22 May 1931 - SCHOOL TEACHER'S DEATH. - Trove (nla.gov.au) https://trove.nla.gov.au/newspaper/article/235047294
 Obituary of Miss Hannah Dudley (1862–1931) 06 Jun 1931 - Death of Miss Hannah Dudley - Trove (nla.gov.au) https://trove.nla.gov.au/newspaper/article/155368061
 Obituary of Mrs Hannah Dudley (née Brereton) (1824–1911) 11 Mar 1911 - The Church Triumphant - Trove (nla.gov.au) https://trove.nla.gov.au/newspaper/article/155389351

1862 births
1931 deaths
Indian diaspora in Fiji
Australian expatriates in Fiji
Australian Methodist missionaries
Methodist missionaries in Fiji
People from Maitland, New South Wales
Australian emigrants to New Zealand
Methodist missionaries in India
Female Christian missionaries
Australian expatriates in India
Burials at Hillsborough Cemetery, Auckland